Meir Shamgar (August 13, 1925 – October 18, 2019) was the chief justice of the Israeli Supreme Court from 1983 to 1995.

Biography

Meir Shamgar (Sterenberg or Sternberg) was born in the Free City of Danzig (present-day Gdańsk, Poland) to Eliezer and Dina Sterenberg. His parents were Revisionist Zionists. He immigrated to Palestine in 1939. He attended high school at the Balfour Gymnasium in Tel Aviv.

He joined the Palmach and served in Company D. He then joined the Irgun. He was arrested in 1944 for anti-British activities, and interned in Africa at a detention camp in Eritrea. While in detention in Eritrea he studied law by a correspondence course with the University of London.  Fellow inmates in Eritrea included Yitzhak Shamir and Shmuel Tamir. He participated in an escape attempt.

In 1948, with the establishment of Israel, he was returned to Israel with the other detainees, where he enlisted in the Israel Defense Forces and participated in the 1948 Arab-Israeli War.

After the war, he studied history and philosophy at the Hebrew University of Jerusalem and law at the Government Law School of the University of London.

On the morning of 18 October 2019, it was announced in Israeli media outlets that Shamgar had died. He was 94.

Legal career
Following his studies, Shamgar rejoined the army as a military prosecutor. He was appointed Deputy Military Advocate General in 1956, and Military Advocate General in 1961. Following the Six-Day War, he designed the legal infrastructure of the Israeli military government in the West Bank and Gaza Strip. He attained the rank of Brigadier General. After retiring from the military, he served as Attorney General from 1968 to 1975. In 1975, he was appointed a justice of the Israeli Supreme Court. In 1982, he was appointed Deputy President of the Supreme Court, and in 1983, he became the chief justice of the Supreme Court. He retired in 1995.

In 1996 Shamgar chaired the Commission of Inquiry into the murder of Prime Minister Yitzhak Rabin.

Personal life
Shamgar had three children with his wife Geula, who died in 1983. After her death, he married Michal Rubinstein, a retired judge who served as Vice President of the Tel Aviv District Court.

See also
 List of Israel Prize recipients

References

External links
 And Justice for all, Voice of sweet reason
 Uri Weiss, Remembering Meir Shamgar, the chief legal architect of Israeli apartheid

1925 births
2019 deaths
Chief justices of the Supreme Court of Israel
Judges of the Supreme Court of Israel
Israel Prize for special contribution to society and the State recipients
Alumni of University of London Worldwide
Alumni of the University of London
Jewish emigrants from Nazi Germany to Mandatory Palestine
Irgun members
People from the Free City of Danzig
Hebrew University of Jerusalem alumni